Joan Dunayer is an American writer, editor, and animal rights advocate. She is the author of two books, Animal Equality (2001) and Speciesism (2004).

Dunayer graduated from Princeton University and has master's degrees in English literature, education, and psychology.

Selected works

Books 

Speciesism (Derwood, MD: Ryce Publishing, 2004).
Animal Equality: Language and Liberation (Derwood, MD: Ryce Publishing, 2001).

Book Chapters 
“Mixed Messages: Opinion Pieces by Representatives of US Nonhuman-Advocacy Organizations,” in Critical Animal and Media Studies: Communication for Nonhuman Animal Advocacy, ed. Núria Almiron, Matthew Cole, and Carrie P. Freeman (New York: Routledge, 2016), 91-106.

“The Rights of Sentient Beings: Moving Beyond Old and New Speciesism,” in The Politics of Species: Reshaping Our Relationships with Other Animals, ed. Raymond Corbey and Annette Lanjouw (Cambridge, UK: Cambridge University Press, 2013), 27–39.

“Sexist Words, Speciesist Roots,” in Animals and Women: Feminist Theoretical Explorations, ed. Carol J. Adams and Josephine Donovan (Durham, NC: Duke University Press, 1995), 11–31.

Articles 

"Advancing Animal Rights" Journal of Animal Law (Volume III, 2007)
"Serving Abuse: Promoting Animal-Derived Food" Satya Magazine (October 2006)
"Reply to a Self-Proclaimed Speciesist" Vegan Voice (September/November 2005)
"From Speciesism to Equality" The Vegan (Summer 2005)
"Animal Rights "Welfarists": An Oxymoron" Satya Magazine (March 2005)
"English and Speciesism" English Today (Vol. 19, No. 1, 2003)
"Animal Equality" Speech at Animal Rights Vienna conference in Austria (September 2002)
"On Speciesist Language" On The Issues Magazine (Winter 1990)

See also
 List of animal rights advocates

References

Further reading

Interview of Joan Dunayer Vegan Festivals (2005)
Joan Dunayer on Speciesism Animal Voices (November 23, 2004)
Animal Equality: Language and Liberation. The Joan Dunayer Interview.  Vegan Voice (2001)
Interview with Joan Dunayer Animal Voices (July 26, 2001)

Year of birth missing (living people)
American animal rights scholars
American veganism activists
Living people
Princeton University alumni